Abdoul Aziz Ndaw (31 May 1922 – 12 February 2011) was a Senegalese politician. He served as President of the National Assembly of Senegal from 1988 to 1993.

References 

1922 births
2011 deaths
Socialist Party of Senegal politicians
Presidents of the National Assembly (Senegal)
20th-century Senegalese politicians
Members of the National Assembly (France)